Mount Sarnegor is the mostly ice-covered mountain of elevation 1189 m in Solvay Mountains on Brabant Island in the Palmer Archipelago, Antarctica.  It has steep and partly ice-free southwest and northwest slopes, and surmounts Zlatiya Glacier to the north, Rush Glacier to the south and Aluzore Gap to the east-northeast.  A westerly offshoot of the feature forms Sidell Spur, extending to the seashore.

The mountain is named after the settlement of Sarnegor in Southern Bulgaria.

Location
British mapping in 1980 and 2008.

Maps
 Antarctic Digital Database (ADD). Scale 1:250000 topographic map of Antarctica. Scientific Committee on Antarctic Research (SCAR). Since 1993, regularly upgraded and updated.
British Antarctic Territory. Scale 1:200000 topographic map. DOS 610 Series, Sheet W 64 62. Directorate of Overseas Surveys, Tolworth, UK, 1980.
Brabant Island to Argentine Islands. Scale 1:250000 topographic map. British Antarctic Survey, 2008.

Notes

References
 Bulgarian Antarctic Gazetteer. Antarctic Place-names Commission. (details in Bulgarian, basic data in English)
 Mount Sarnegor. SCAR Composite Antarctic Gazetteer.

External links
 Mount Sarnegor. Copernix satellite image

Mountains of the Palmer Archipelago
Bulgaria and the Antarctic